Santo Antônio do Jardim (Portuguese meaning "Saint Anthony of the garden") is a municipality in the eastern part of the state of São Paulo in Brazil. The population is 5,940 (2020 est.) in an area of 109.96 km2. The elevation is 850 m.  Santo Antônio do Jardim  is located north of the state capital named São Paulo and east-northeast of Campinas. The state of Minas Gerais is bounded to the east.

Neighboring municipalities

Albertina, Minas Gerais
Andradas
Espírito Santo do Pinhal
São João da Boa Vista

References

External links
  http://www.stoantoniojardim.sp.gov.br
  Santo Antônio do Jardim on citybrazil.com.br

Municipalities in São Paulo (state)